Game Farm Marsh Wildlife Management Area is a  Wildlife Management Area in New Kent County, Virginia.  It consists entirely of wetland habitat on the northern shore of Chickahominy Lake and can only be accessed by boat. Much of the property is covered by bald cypress swamp with dark, tannin-rich waters, thick with submerged vegetation and covered by duck weed in the warmer months. Two creeks allow access into the interior.

Although the area adjoins a Virginia Department of Forestry tree farm, Game Farm Marsh Wildlife Management Area is owned and maintained by the Virginia Department of Game and Inland Fisheries. The area is open to the public for waterfowl hunting, trapping, fishing, and boating. Access for persons 17 years of age or older requires a valid hunting or fishing permit, a current Virginia boat registration, or a WMA access permit.

See also
 List of Virginia Wildlife Management Areas

References

External links
Virginia Department of Game and Inland Fisheries: Game Farm Marsh

Wildlife management areas of Virginia
Protected areas of New Kent County, Virginia
Wetlands of Virginia